Mike Costa is an American comic book and television writer. His first published work was 2008's The Secret History of the Authority: Hawksmoor with artist Fiona Staples for WildStorm. He also wrote Resistance, a comic book series based on the Resistance video games. Costa has written Transformers for IDW. Costa is currently writing IDW Publishing’s G.I. Joe: Cobra and Blackhawks for DC Comics.

His work on the GI Joe franchise was critically acclaimed and lauded by Brian K. Vaughan as an example of a licensed comic equal in quality to mainstream or creator-owned works.

He began writing for the FOX TV show Lucifer in its first season, and became a producer after it moved to Netflix during the fourth season.

Bibliography

Wildstorm
Secret History of The Authority: Hawksmoor (limited series, March 2008-August 2008)
Secret History of the Authority: Hawksmoor (tpb, 144 pages, 2009) collects:
 "Uptown & Downtown" (with Fiona Staples, in #1, 2008)
 "Housing & Development" (with Fiona Staples, in #2, 2008)
 "Bridge & Tunnel" (with Fiona Staples, in #3, 2008)
 "Parks & Recreation" (with Fiona Staples, in #4, 2008)
 "Highways & Byways" (with Fiona Staples, in #5, 2008)
 "Town & Country" (with Fiona Staples, in #6, 2008)
Resistance (limited series, January 2009-May 2009)
Resistance (tpb, 160 pages, 2010) collects:
 "Dancers On A Plane" (with Ramón K. Pérez, in #1, 2009)
 "False Start" (with Ramón K. Pérez, in #2, 2009)
 "Fool's House" (with Ramón K. Pérez, in #3, 2009)
 "Untitled" (with Ramón K. Pérez, in #4, 2009)
 "Target With Five Faces" (with Ramón K. Pérez, in #5, 2009)
 "White Flag" (with Ramón K. Pérez, in #6, 2009)

IDW Publishing
G.I. Joe: Cobra vol. 1 (limited series, March 2009-June 2009)
 volume 1 (tpb, 132 pages, 2009) collects:
 "Charmer" (with Christos Gage and Antonio Fuso, in #1, 2009)
 "In The Grass" (with Christos Gage and Antonio Fuso, in #2, 2009)
 "Oil" (with Christos Gage and Antonio Fuso, in #3, 2009)
 "Eyes" (with Christos Gage and Antonio Fuso, in #4, 2009)
 "Cobra" (with Antonio Fuso, in G.I. Joe: Cobra Special #1, 2009)
The Transformers: All Hail Megatron #13, "Uneasy Lies the Head", #16, "The Man of Steel (with Chee Yang Ong and Guido Guidi, July–October 2009) collected in Volume 4 (tpb, 104 pages, 2010)
The Transformers #1-31 (November 2009-December 2011)
Volume 1: For All Mankind (tpb, 152 pages, 2010) collects:
 "...For All Mankind" (with Don Figueroa, in #1, 2009)
 "Things Fall Apart" (with Don Figueroa, in #2-5, 2009-2010)
Volume 2: International Incident (tpb, 144 pages, 2010) collects:
 "All His Engines" (with E. J. Su, in #7, 2010)
 "Scrapper" (with Javier Saltares, in #8, 2010)
 "International Incident" (with Guido Guidi, in #9-12, 2010)
Volume 3: Revenge of the Decepticons (tpb, 148 pages, 2011) collects:
 "Heart Like A Wheel" (with Nick Roche, in #13, 2010)
 "Revenge of the Decepticons" (with Don Figueroa and Alex Milne, in #14-18, 2010-2011)
Volume 5: Chaos Theory (tpb, 124 pages, 2011) collects:
 "Space Opera" (with Guido Guidi, in #19-21, 2011)
 "Chaos Theory" (with Alex Milne, in #22-23, 2011)
Volume 6: Police Action (tpb, 104 pages, 2012) collects:
 "Police Action" (with Brendan Cahill, in #25, #27, #29, 2011)
 "Ride-Along" (with E. J. Su, in The Transformers: Spotlight - Prowl, 2010)
Volume 7: Chaos (tpb, 124 pages, 2012) collects:
 "Chaos" (with James Roberts and Livio Ramondelli, in #24, #26, #28, #30, 2011)
 "Pax Cybertronia" (with Casey W. Coller, in #31, 2011) 
G.I. Joe: Cobra vol. 2 #1-13 (January 2010-February 2011)
Volume 2 (tpb, 122 pages, 2010) collects:
 "Forked Tongue" (with Christos Gage and Antonio Fuso, in #1, 2010)
 "Scales" (with Christos Gage and Antonio Fuso, in #2, 2010)
 "Fangs" (with Christos Gage and Antonio Fuso, in #3, 2010)
 "Cold-Blooded" (with Christos Gage and Antonio Fuso, in #4, 2010)
 "Chameleon: Changing Colors; Speed Trap" (with Antonio Fuso, in G.I. Joe: Cobra Special #2, 2010)
Volume 3 (tpb, 120 pages, 2011) collects:
 "Serpent's Tale, Part 1: The Nest" (with Christos Gage and Sergio Carrera, in #5, 2010)
 "Serpent's Tale Part 2: The Nest" (with Christos Gage and Sergio Carrera, in #6, 2010)
 "Serpent's Tale part 3: Green Dreams" (written by Christos Gage and drawn by Sergio Carrera, in #7, 2010)
 "Serpent's Tale Part 4: Viper's Nest" (with Christos Gage and Sergio Carrera, in #8, 2010)
 "Serpent's Tale, Part 5: Viper's Nest" (with Christos Gage and Sergio Carrera, in #9, 2010)
Volume 4 (tpb, 104 pages, 2011) collects:
 "Sidewinder" (with Christos Gage, Antonio Fuso and S.L. Gallant, in #10, 2010)
 "Constrictor" (with Christos Gage, Antonio Fuso and Chee Yang Ong, in #11, 2010)
 "Rattler" (with Christos Gage and Antonio Fuso, in #12, 2011)
 "King Cobra" (with Christos Gage and Antonio Fuso, in #13, 2011)
The Transformers: Ironhide (limited series, May 2010-August 2010) 
The Transformers: Ironhide (tpb, 104 pages, 2010) collects:
 "The Iron Age" (with Casey W. Coller, in #1, 2010)
 "Iron In The Blood" (with Casey W. Coller, in #2, 2010)
 "Ironing Out the Details" (with Casey W. Coller, in #3, 2010)
 "Any Old Iron" (with Casey W. Coller, in #4, 2010)
G.I. Joe: Cobra vol. 3 #0-21 (May 2011-January 2013)
G.I. Joe: Cobra Civil War Compendium (tpb, 564 pages, 2013, 1-61377-561-X) collects:
 "G.I. Joe: Cobra Civil War" #0 (with Chuck Dixon and Agustin Padilla, 2011)
 "Cobra Civil War Part 3" (with Antonio Fuso, in #1, 2011)
 "Cobra Civil War Part 6" (with Antonio Fuso, in #2, 2011)
 "Cobra Civil War Part 9" (with Antonio Fuso, in #3, 2011)
 "Cobra Civil War Part 12" (with Antonio Fuso, in #4, 2011)
 "Cobra Civil War Part 15" (with Werther Dell'Edera, in #5, 2011)
 "Cobra Civil War Part 18" (with  Werther Dell'Edera, in #6, 2011)
 "Cobra Civil War Part 21" (with Antonio Fuso, in #7, 2011)
 "Cobra Civil War Part 24" (with Antonio Fuso and  Werther Dell'Edera, in #8, 2011)
G.I. Joe: Complete Cobra Command (tpb, 328 pages, 2013) collects:
 "Cobra Command Part 3" (with Alex Cal, in #9, 2012)
 "Cobra Command Part 6" (with Alex Cal, in #10, 2012)
 "Cobra Command Part 9" (with Alex Cal, in #11, 2012)
 "The Last Laugh: Cobra Command Aftermath" (with Antonio Fuso, in #12, 2012)
G.I. Joe: Cobra - Son of the Snake (tpb, 104 pages, 2013) collects:
 "Son of the Snake, Part 1: A New Era" (with Antonio Fuso, in #13, 2012)
 "Son of the Snake, Part 2: G.I. Joe Underground" (with Antonio Fuso and Werther Dell'Edera, in #14, 2012)
 "Son of the Snake, Part 3: Lies and Betrayals" (with Antonio Fuso and Werther Dell'Edera, in #15, 2012)
 "Son of the Snake, Part 4; The Hunt is On!" (with Antonio Fuso, in #16, 2012)
G.I. Joe: Cobra - Oktober Guard (tpb, 128 pages, 2013) collects:
 "Oktober Guard, Part 1: Blood Lines" (with Werther Dell'Edera, in #17, 2012)
 "Oktober Guard, Part 2: Oktober is Coming!" (with Antonio Fuso, in #18, 2012)
 "Oktober Guard, Part 3: The Ocktober Guard" (with Antonio Fuso and Atilio Rojo, in #19, 2012)
 "Oktober Guard, Part 4: Oktober is Burning!" (with Antonio Fuso and Werther Dell'Edera, in #20, 2012)
 "Oktober Guard, Part 5: Oktober Ends!" (with Werther Dell'Edera, in #21, 2013)
Smoke and Mirrors (5-issue limited series, with Jon Armstrong and Ryan Browne, March–August 2012, collected in Smoke and Mirrors, tpb, 128 pages, 2012)
Haunted Horror #2-3, #5-8 (with Antonio Fuso, December 2012-December 2013)
G.I. Joe: The Cobra Files #1-9 (April 2013-December 2013)
Volume 1 (tpb, 104 pages, 2013) collects:
 "Snakes and Tigers" (with Antonio Fuso, in #1-4, 2013)
Volume 2 (tpb, 124 pages, 2014) collects:
 "The Boy Most Likely To....." (with Werther Dell'Edera, in #5-6, 2013)
 "The House Always Wins" (with Antonio Fuso, in #7-9, 2013)
G.I. JOE: Snake Eyes, Agent of Cobra (limited series, January 2015-May 2015)
G.I. JOE: Snake Eyes, Agent of Cobra (tpb, 120 pages, 2015) collects:
 "Part One: The Tin Man" (with Paolo Villainelli, in #1, 2015)
 "Part Two: The Dark Sister" (with Paolo Villainelli, in #2, 2015)
 "Part Three: The Lost Boy" (with Paolo Villainelli, in #3, 2015)
 "Part Four: Knight Errant" (with Paolo Villainelli, in #4, 2015)
 "Part Five: The Silent Warrior" (with Paolo Villainelli, in #5, 2015)

DC Comics
Blackhawks #1-6 (September 2011-April 2012)
Volume 1: The Great Leap Forward (tpb, 192 pages, 2012) collects:
 "Blackhawks" (with Graham Nolan, in #1, 2011)
 "Blades" (with Graham Nolan, in #2, 2011)
 "Beauty" (with Graham Nolan, in #3, 2011)
 "Bones" (with Graham Nolan, in #4, 2011)
 "Burial" (with CAFU, in #5, 2012)
 "Obsolescence Part 1: Technical" (with CAFU, in #6, 2012)
 "Obsolescence Part 2: Functional" (with CAFU and Carlos Rodriguez, in #7, 2012)
 "Obsolescence Part 3: Planned" (with CAFU, in #8, 2012)

Marvel Comics
A+X #6, "The Thing + Gambit" (with Stefano Caselli, March 2013) collected in Volume 1: =Awesome, tpb, 144 pages, 2013)
All-New X-Men/Indestructible Hulk/Superior Spider-Man Team-Up: The Arms of the Octopus (3-issue limited series, with Kris Anka, Jake Wyatt and Michael Dialynas, October 2013, collected in All-New X-Men/Indestructible Hulk/Superior Spider-Man: The Arms of the Octopus, tpb, 96 pages, 2014)
Scarlet Spiders (limited series, November 2014-January 2015)
 Spider-Verse (hc, 648 pages, 2015) collects:
 "The Widow" (with Paco Díaz, in #1, 2014)
 "The Other" (with Paco Díaz, in #2, 2014)
 "The Hero" (with Paco Díaz, in #3, 2015)
Avengers: Millennium (6-issue limited series, with Carmine Di Giandomenico, February–March 2015, collected in Avengers: Millennium, tpb, 136 pages, 2015)
Spider-Verse vol. 2 (5-issue limited series with Andre Lima Araujo and Steven Sanders, May–September 2015, collected in Spider-Verse: Warzones, tpb, 120 pages, 2015)
Web Warriors #1-11 (November 2015-September 2016)
Volume 1: Electroverse (tpb, 128 pages, 2016) collects:
 "Static" (with David Baldeón, in #1, 2015)
 "Charge" (with David Baldeón, in #2, 2015)
 "Capacity" (with David Baldeón, in #3, 2016)
 "Resistance" (with David Baldeón, in #4, 2016) 
 "Insulation" (with David Baldeón, in #5, 2016)
Volume 2: Spiders Vs. (tpb, 136 pages, 2016) collects:
 "Nobody Knows Nothing"  (with David Baldeón, in #6, 2016)
 "Tangled States - Part One: Anarchy" (with David Baldeón, in #7, 2016)
 "Tangled States - Part Two: Technocracy" (with David Baldeón, in #8, 2016)
 "Tangled States - Part Three: Brave New World" (with David Baldeón, in #9, 2016)
 "Tangled States - Part Four: Monarchy" (with David Baldeón and Jay Fosgitt, in #10, 2016)
 "Tangled States - Part Five: Democracy" (with David Baldeón, in #11, 2016)
Venom vol. 3 #1-6 (November 2016-April 2017)
Volume 1: Homecoming (tpb, 136 pages, 2017) collects:
 "Homecoming" (with Gerardo Sandoval, Juanan Ramírez and Iban Coello in #1-6, 2016-2017)
Venom vol. 1 #150-165 (May 2017 – June 2018)
Venom: First Host #1-5 (October 2018-November 2018)

Avatar Press
God Is Dead #1-48 (with Jonathan Hickman, Di Amorim, Juan Frigeri, German Erramouspe, Omar Francia, Emiliano Urdinola, Michael DiPascale and Nahuel Lopez, September 2013-March 2016) 
Volume 1 #1-6 (tpb, 160 pages, 2014)
Volume 2 #7-12 (tpb, 160 pages, 2014)
volume 3 #13-18 (tpb, 160 pages, 2014)
Volume 4 #19-24 (tpb, 144 pages, 2015)
Volume 5 #25-30 (tpb, 160 pages, 2015)
Volume 6 #31-36 (tpb, 144 pages, 2015)
Volume 7 #37-42 (tpb, 144 pages, 2016)
Volume 8 #43-48 (tpb, 160 pages, 2016)

Boundless Comics
Belladonna #0 (with Ignacio Calero, December 2015)
Lookers #0 (with Renato Camilo, June 2016)

Personal life

Mike Costa lives in Los Angeles, California where he is a writer and producer on Lucifer.

Notes

External links
 Interview with Mike Costa (Comic Book Resources, January 2009)
 
 

Living people
American comics writers
Year of birth missing (living people)
Place of birth missing (living people)